The following outline is provided as an overview of and topical guide to public health:

Public health has been defined as "the science and art of preventing disease”, prolonging life and improving quality of life through organized efforts and informed choices of society, organizations (public and private), communities and individuals.

Nature of public health

Concepts 
 Communicable disease
 Non-communicable disease

Disciplines 
 Bacteriology
 Biostatistics
 Environmental health
 Epidemiology
 Health administration
 Health policy
 Health politics
 Health education
 Occupational safety and health

Methods of public health

Prevention 
 Health promotion
 Healthy community design
 Environmental protection

Theories of public health 
 Germ theory

References 

Public health
Public health